Ivan Eland (born February 23, 1958) is an American defense analyst and writer. He is a Senior Fellow and Director of the Center on Peace and Liberty at the Independent Institute. Eland's writings generally propose libertarian and non-interventionist policies. Books that he has authored include Recarving Rushmore.

Life
Eland received an M.B.A. in Applied Economics and a Ph.D. in National Security Policy from George Washington University. He has previously served as Director of Defense Policy Studies at the Cato Institute, as Principal Defense Analyst at the Congressional Budget Office, as an investigator dealing with national security and intelligence for the Government Accountability Office, and on a House Committee on Foreign Affairs special investigation of allegations that the U.S. sold weapons to Iraq prior to 1991. He has testified before the House Committee on Oversight and Government Reform and the Senate Committee on Foreign Relations.

Ivan Eland is the author of Putting "Defense" Back into U.S. Defense Policy (2001), The Empire Has No Clothes: U.S. Foreign Policy Exposed (2004), Recarving Rushmore: Ranking the Presidents on Peace, Prosperity, and Liberty (2008; updated edition 2014) and Partitioning for Peace: An Exit Strategy for Iraq (2009). He has also written essays, including forty-five in-depth studies on national security issues Ivan Eland, and numerous  popular articles. He addressed the subjects of foreign relations, defense policy, military readiness and threat analysis, Sino-American relations, the Taiwan issue, terrorism and its effects on civil liberties, the lessons of the Vietnam War, WMD proliferation, National Missile Defense, the National Security Agency, the ABM Treaty, submarines, special operations forces, NATO expansion, and U.S. policy towards Iraq and Iran.

Political opinions
Eland is a libertarian, generally supporting non-interventionism and limited government. In his 2008 book Recarving Rushmore, Eland argued that historians' rankings of US presidents fail to reflect presidents' actual services to the country. In the book, he rated 40 US presidents on the basis of whether or not their policies promoted peace, prosperity, and liberty during their tenures; John Tyler and Grover Cleveland were ranked the two strongest, while Harry Truman and Woodrow Wilson came in last.

Eland once named Jimmy Carter "the best modern president," praising Carter's restrained foreign policy and deregulation of several American industries. Eland continues to strongly oppose the 2003 invasion of Iraq, and called George W. Bush's presidency "one of the worst of all time." Eland is the Assistant Editor of the Independent Review, writes a regular column for the website Antiwar.com, contributes frequently at Consortium News Robert Parry's website of investigative journalism. Eland is on the Advisory Council of the Democracy Institute.

Eland supports the National Rifle Association of America (NRA); he is a critic of the Affordable Care Act and race-based affirmative action. Regarding global warming, Eland does not believe in climate change. He argues that the threats posed are sensationalized. Eland has appeared on RT, formerly known as Russia Today, a Russian state-sponsored cable television channel, from 2011 to the present.

See also

Libertarianism in the United States

References

External links
 Bio from the Independent Institute
 Bio from the Cato Institute
 Column archive from The Huffington Post
 
 The Empire Has No Clothes, Eland's column at Antiwar.com

1958 births
Living people
21st-century American male writers
21st-century American non-fiction writers
American anti–Iraq War activists
American columnists
American foreign policy writers
American gun rights activists
American libertarians
American male bloggers
American bloggers
American male non-fiction writers
American military writers
American political writers
Cato Institute people
George Washington University School of Business alumni
HuffPost writers and columnists
Libertarian theorists
Non-interventionism